Catre or Katre was a town of ancient Crete. 

Its site is tentatively located near modern Prophitis Ilias, Kadros.

References

Populated places in ancient Crete
Former populated places in Greece